Big Survey Wildlife Management Area is a  Wildlife Management Area in Wythe County, Virginia.  The preserve's woodland sits on four mountain ridges and divides the watersheds of Reed and Cripple creeks in the New River Valley.  Among the trees and shrubs to be found there are rhododendron, azalea, oak, hickory, and pine.

Big Survey Wildlife Management Area is owned and maintained by the Virginia Department of Game and Inland Fisheries. The area is open to the public for hunting, hiking, horseback riding, and camping. Access for persons 17 years of age or older requires a valid hunting permit, fishing permit, or WMA access permit.

See also
 List of Virginia Wildlife Management Areas

References

External links
Virginia Department of Game and Inland Fisheries: Big Survey Wildlife Management Area

Wildlife management areas of Virginia
Protected areas of Wythe County, Virginia